Dizzy Gillespie's Big 4 (also released as Dizzy's Big 4) is an album by Dizzy Gillespie recorded in 1974 and released on the Pablo label.

Reception
The AllMusic review called the album "easily one of Dizzy Gillespie's best small-group recordings from the latter portion of his career".

Track listing
All compositions by Dizzy Gillespie except as indicated
 "Frelimo" - 8:14 
 "Hurry Home" (Buddy Bernier, Joseph Meyer, Robert D. Emmerich) - 6:24 
 "Russian Lullaby" (Irving Berlin) - 6:51 
 "Be Bop (Dizzy's Fingers)" - 4:31 
 "Birks' Works" - 8:55 
 "September Song" (Maxwell Anderson, Kurt Weill) - 2:48 
 "Jitterbug Waltz" (Fats Waller) - 6:55

Personnel
Dizzy Gillespie - trumpet
Joe Pass - guitar
Ray Brown - bass
Mickey Roker - drums

References 

Pablo Records albums
Dizzy Gillespie albums
Albums produced by Norman Granz
1975 albums